Ruprekha Banerjee (born 1984 in Kolkata) is an Indian musician. She was one of the three finalists of Fame Gurukul, one of the most watched television shows in India, along with Rex D'Souza and Qazi Touqeer. On 20 October 2005, she won the top prize along with Touqeer.

Her debut album, Yeh Pal, with Qazi Touqeer, went Double Platinum in India and sold over 5 million copies worldwide. She participated in a new reality show aired by Star Plus named Jo Jeeta Wohi Superstar and Royal Bengal Super Star by Star Jalsa.

Early life 
Ruprekha Banerjee was born on 28 July 1984 in Bongaon, North 24 Parganas district, West Bengal, India, to Bengali parents, Pradip Kr. Banerjee and Kabita Banerjee. She spent the first three months of her life in her birthplace in West Bengal, and then moved to Agarpara, Kolkata, where she lived with her businessman father. She spent her first eighteen years there and completed her schooling up to the tenth standard, in Ramakrishna Mission, Barrackpore, the 12th Standard from Ariyadaha Sarbamangala Vidyapith, then Vidyasagar College and finally at the University of Calcutta with honours in zoology.

At the age of six, she began learning music, mainly Rabindra Sangeet, from her first Guru – her grandfather. She gave her first stage performance at their club's annual function. At the age of seven, she began formal training in Hindustani Classical Music. She learned Classical Hindustani Music from Sangeeta Das of Agarpara, Neela Goswami up to the age of 10 and Anju Chakraborty up to the age of 16. She learned light classical Hindustan music from Arun Bhaduri and thereafter, she got her initial exposure to Bengali film background songs and Bengali serial title songs. She received training in playback singing from  Bharat Ratna Pandit Late Bhimsen Joshi's student Maloy Banerjee at a later stage in Mumbai after shifting there. She continued her training in classical Hindustani music with Late Mira Bandhopadhya's student Kanika Mitra.

Career
In 2005, she was the winner of Fame Gurukul, the all India music competition, Mumbai, organized by Sony TV. Judges Javed Akhtar, KK, and Shankar Mahadevan evaluated her at various stages.

In 2006, she was selected for a special episode of Jo Jeeta Wohi Super Star being judged by Vishal Dadlani, Shekhar Ravijani and Farah Khan. 

In 2007, she started recording in regional languages such as Bhojpuri, and Bengali. After Fame Gurukul, she has continuously worked and recorded songs with many music directors. She has recorded film songs not only in Bengali but also in Hindi, Bhojpuri, and Gujrati.

She worked with music directors including Bickram Ghosh, Ashok Bhadra, Shankar Mahadevan, Indrajit Dey, Nabin Chottopadhyay, Raju Mukherjee, Prosenjit Chatterjee, Arup Om, Joy Sarkar, Rupankar Bagchi, Goutam Ghosal, Indradeep Dasgupta, Subhadeep Chatterjee and Purbayan Chatterjee.

Discography
Yeh Pal
Karoon Kya
Hero
Meri Mehbooba
Kehkashan
Maddham
Meri Choodiyaan

Albums in Bengali:
 Bondhu Hobe... 2011 Puja album by Sagarika Super Hit...
 Electronic A Krishna she is performing with music directed by Indra
 Rabindra Sangeet album by Bickram Ghosh

Personal life 
In 2005, she moved to Mumbai with her family after being crowned the winner of Fame Gurukul.

She is married to Nalinakshya Bhattacharya and has a daughter, Sheerin Bhattacharya.

Awards 
She has won and has been nominated for a number of awards. She won the "Fame Gurukul" Award for Most Promising reality show for Mast, the award and the “Sera Bengali-2006” Award. She won the "Sananda Adittiya” Award, Best Rising Singer Award 2012 - Kalakar Awards, Best Album 2012, "Bharat Nirman Award" - 2013 for Best Raising Singer - Female and was nominated for "Bondhu Hobe".

References

External links
 Review of Qazi Touqeer and Ruprekha Banerjee's first album: Jodi No. 1

Living people
Fame Gurukul contestants
Indian women playback singers
Singing talent show winners
1984 births
Bollywood playback singers
Singers from Kolkata
Ramakrishna Mission schools alumni
Vidyasagar College alumni
University of Calcutta alumni
Women musicians from West Bengal
21st-century Indian women singers
21st-century Indian singers